The Mark 10 nuclear bomb was a proposed American nuclear bomb based on the earlier Mark 8 nuclear bomb design.  The Mark 10, like the Mark 8, is a Gun-type nuclear weapon, which rapidly assembles several critical masses of fissile nuclear material by firing a fissile projectile or "bullet" over a fissile "target", using a system which closely resembles a medium-sized cannon barrel and propellant.

The Mark 10 was intended to be a general purpose airburst nuclear weapon, unlike the Mark 8 which was intended to penetrate into the ground as a Nuclear bunker buster. It was nicknamed the "Airburst Elsie"; the Mark 8 had been nicknamed the LC or Light Casing bomb, which was then expanded to "Elsie." It had a design yield of 12 to 15 kilotons.

The Mark 10 design was cancelled in 1952, replaced by the implosion-type Mark 12 which was lighter and used considerably less fissile material.

See also
 List of nuclear weapons
 Mark 1 Little Boy nuclear bomb
 Mark 8 nuclear bomb

External links
 Allbombs.html list of all US nuclear warheads at nuclearweaponarchive.org
 

Cold War aerial bombs of the United States
Gun-type nuclear bombs
Nuclear bombs of the United States